Justin Schau (born 21 September 1998) is a German footballer who plays as a midfielder for Carl Zeiss Jena.

References

External links
 

1998 births
Living people
Sportspeople from Jena
German footballers
Association football midfielders
FC Carl Zeiss Jena players
3. Liga players
Footballers from Thuringia